The 1973 NCAA College Division basketball tournament involved 42 schools playing in a single-elimination tournament to determine the national champion of men's NCAA College Division basketball as a culmination of the 1972-73 NCAA College Division men's basketball season. It was won by Kentucky Wesleyan College and Kentucky Wesleyan's Mike Williams was the Most Outstanding Player.

This was the last College Division basketball tournament. Effective with the next school year of 1973–74, the NCAA adopted the three-division setup that exists to this day. The top-level University Division was renamed Division I, while the College Division was split in two. College Division members that wished to award athletic scholarships were placed in Division II, while those that chose to remain non-scholarship were placed in Division III.

Regional participants

*denotes tie

Regionals

Midwest - Springfield, Missouri
Location: McDonald Hall and Arena Host: Southwest Missouri State University

Third Place - SW Missouri State 76, Southern Colorado 62

New England - Worcester, Massachusetts
Location: Andrew Laska Gymnasium Host: Assumption College

Third Place - Bridgeport 93, St. Michael's 75

Mideast - Reading, Pennsylvania
Location: Bollman Center Host: Albright College

Third Place - Cheyney 70, Philadelphia Textile 63

South - Hammond, Louisiana
Location: unknown Host: Southeastern Louisiana University

Third Place - Chattanooga 99, Transylvania 86

Great Lakes - Evansville, Indiana
Location: Roberts Municipal Stadium Host: University of Evansville

Third Place - Capital 75, Wooster 47

South Atlantic - Salem, Virginia
Location: C. Homer Bast Center Host: Roanoke College

Third Place - Fayetteville State 81, Loyola 66

East - Oneonta, New York
Location: Binder Physical Education Center Host: Hartwick College

Third Place - C. W. Post 79, Potsdam State 75

West - Bakersfield, California
Location: unknown Host: California State College, Bakersfield

Third Place - San Diego 80, Puget Sound 73

*denotes each overtime played

National Finals - Evansville, Indiana
Location: Roberts Municipal Stadium Host: University of Evansville

Third Place - Assumption 94, Brockport State 90

*denotes each overtime played

All-tournament team
 Mike Boylan (Assumption)
 Ron Gilliam (Brockport State)
 Leonard Robinson (Tennessee State)
 Mike Williams (Kentucky Wesleyan)
 Roger Zornes (Kentucky Wesleyan)

See also
 1973 NCAA University Division basketball tournament
 1973 NAIA Basketball Tournament

References

Sources
 2010 NCAA Men's Basketball Championship Tournament Records and Statistics: Division II men's basketball Championship
 1973 NCAA College Division Men's Basketball Tournament jonfmorse.com

NCAA Division II men's basketball tournament
Tournament
NCAA College Division basketball tournament
NCAA College Division basketball tournament